David Floyd Davis (July 10, 1867 – November 7, 1951) was an American businessman and politician from New York.

Life
He was the son of David Frank Davis and Betsey Sophia (Wiggins) Davis. In 1890, he opened an oil distribution business. On November 15, 1893, he married Edith Clyde Smith, and they had two children.

Davis was a member of the New York State Assembly (Kings Co., 4th D.) in 1898; and a member of the New York State Senate (4th D.) in 1899 and 1900.

In 1906, he testified before the Interstate Commerce Commission to how Standard Oil was trying to push independent oil dealers out of business.

Sources
 Davis genealogy
 HOW OIL TRUST BLOCKS NEW YORK COMPETITION in NYT on December 1, 1906
 OIL CO. HELD CULPABLE in NYT on March 25, 1915

1867 births
1951 deaths
Republican Party New York (state) state senators
People from Riverhead (town), New York
Republican Party members of the New York State Assembly
Politicians from Brooklyn